The Lega Basket All Star Game, also commonly known as the Italian Basketball All-Star Game, is an all-star game that organised annually by the Lega Basket, in conjunction with RCS Sport and the Italian Basketball Federation. It brings together a selection of players from the Lega Basket Serie A (LBA), which is the highest-tier level professional basketball league in Italy, to play between themselves, or against another opponent. First held in 1982, the event has seen a fluctuating history, with numerous changes to its format through the years, including the participation of the senior men's Italian national team.

Starting with the 2016–17 season, the annual edition of the All-Star Game was not held.

History
The Italian Basketball Federation organised an All-Star Game in 1980, to celebrate the Italian national team's silver medal at the 1980 Summer Olympics. The first official All-Star Game, which was held on 12 May 1982, was organised by the Lega Basket, which is the entity responsible for organizing the top two professional leagues in Italy, the first-tier level Serie A and the second-tier level Serie A2. Two teams from the respective divisions and the coaches, were chosen by the public, at the league's games, a few weeks before the all-star game, which was held at the Palasport di San Siro in Milan.

For the November 1992 edition, the event was named the ULEB All-Star Game, and it was organised in partnership with the Spanish ACB League's organizing body, the ACB. A squad from each league competed in the game, which was held in Madrid. The formula was repeated the next year, that time in Rome. The 1994 edition of the ULEB All-Star Game, also featured a team of the top-tier level French Pro A League's LNB All-Stars. The three squads, which were mostly made up of foreign players, played each other in games of a single 20 minute quarter, in Valencia's Fuente de San Luis.

The senior men's Italian national team has participated in a number of All-Star Games. Originally, the squad of Serie A based players was very similar to the main squad, with only one player (the Spain-based Nikola Radulović) from the 2003 EuroBasket bronze medal team absent for the December 2003 edition. In later editions, with the departure of a number of players abroad (to the NBA for example), the Italian squads were more experimental, and consisted mostly of reserve team players and promising young players.

The 2014 and 2015 editions saw the absence of EA7 Emporio Armani Milano players, as the club was involved in EuroLeague games during the same period. In November 2016, Lega Basket canceled the All-Star Game for the 2016–17 LBA season. That was decided by the General Meeting of the LBA clubs, which met in Bologna, at the headquarters of the Lega Basket. According to Lega Basket's president, Egidio Bianchi, the Lega Basket was unable to produce an interesting format under which to hold the All-Star Game.

Editions

Three-Point Contest

The Three-point contest, known as the Festina Three Points Contest for sponsorship reasons, was first organised during the December 1986 edition of the all-star game. Oscar Schmidt is the record-holder with four wins in total. He won the Italian League's contest three times (1987, 1988, 1989), and also won it once as a member of the Spanish League All-Star team, during the 1993 All-Star Game 3-Point Contest, which was held between the Spanish League's All-Stars and the Italian League's All-Stars. He also added an unofficial title in December 2003, after he beat the competition's official winner Michele Mian, in an extra contest after the official one.

The latest edition to date (2015), saw the contestants try to score as many three-point field goals as possible, from five shooting positions around the three-point line. With each position consisting of a rack with four balls worth three-points, and a special "Money Ball" worth six; for a total of twenty five shots in one minute, with the highest score crowning the winner.

Slam dunk contest

The slam dunk contest, known as the Openjobmetis Slam Dunk Contest for sponsorship reasons, was first organised by Spain's Liga ACB during the November 1992 and 1994 editions played in that country. The first time it was organised by the Lega Basket was during the December 2005 edition, dunk specialist James White is the record-holder with two wins (Chandler Thompson won both ACB editions).

White refused to defend his title in 2014, having decided to retire from dunk contests following his last place in the 2013 NBA Slam Dunk Contest. It formerly saw the contestants each have two dunk attempts, with the pair performing the best judged dunks reaching the final, where another couple of attempts crowned the winner. The 2015 edition saw the contestants separated into two teams, consisting of players DeQuan Jones and Tony Mitchell each paired with a member of the Da Move freestyle group, whose five attempts each were judged by a panel of experts and the public

Players with most appearances

Family Shootout
The Grundig sponsored Family Shootout was a one-off event that was organised during the April 2014 edition. It saw four pairs of current or former professional players from the same family, contest successive rounds of four shots from different positions. The father-son pair of Nando and Stefano Gentile, prevailed in the final over brothers Michele and Luca Vitali.

Under-23 game
The December 2003 edition included a game played between mostly (but not exclusively) under-23 Italian players, in view of judging their potential as part of the 2005 Belgrade EuroBasket, project by the Italian national team's organisation. Andrea Michelori top-scored with 28 points in the game. Team Blues beat Team Whites, by a score of 90–72.

References

External links
All Star Game boxscores by Lega Basket  Retrieved 12 September 2015
All Star Game team and individual results by Lega Basket  Retrieved 12 September 2015

Basketball all-star games
Annual sporting events in Italy
Recurring sporting events established in 1982
All Star Game
1982 establishments in Italy